Field Music is the full-length debut album by indie rock band Field Music. It was released on 8 August 2005. While digital versions of the album have a white background, the CD packaging was printed on brown card. "If Only The Moon Were Up", "Shorter Shorter" and "You Can Decide" were released as singles.

Track listing
 "If Only the Moon Were Up" – 3:02
 "Tell Me Keep Me" – 3:13
 "Pieces" – 3:02
 "Luck Is a Fine Thing" – 2:18
 "Shorter Shorter" – 1:56
 "It's Not the Only Way to Feel Happy" – 5:21
 "17" – 2:43
 "Like When You Meet Someone Else" – 3:22
 "You Can Decide" – 2:15
 "Got to Get the Nerve" – 4:03
 "Got to Write a Letter" – 3:12
 "You're So Pretty..." – 3:22

US bonus tracks - also available on Write Your Own History
 "You're Not Supposed To" – 2:36
 "Trying to Sit Out" – 1:48
 "I'm Tired" – 2:47

Personnel
Field Music
Peter Brewis
David Brewis
Andrew Moore

Additional personnel
Emma Fisk – violins
Rachel Davis – violins
Peter Richardson – cello
John Steele – saxophone
Tom English (Maxïmo Park) – drums

References

2005 debut albums
Field Music albums
Memphis Industries albums